Tinmouth may refer to:

 Tinmouth, Vermont, USA
 Tinmouth Historic District
 Teignmouth (pronounced Tinmouth), a town in Devon, England
 An archaic spelling of Tynemouth, a town in Northumberland, England
 Jenny Tinmouth (born 1978), motorcycle racer

See also 
 Teignmouth (disambiguation)
 Tinworth
 Morton Tinmouth, a hamlet in Durham, England
 Earl of Tinmouth, a title in the Peearage of England